Heinrich August Marschner (16 August 1795 – 14 December 1861) was the most important composer of German opera between Weber and Wagner.

Biography
Marschner was born in Zittau and was originally intended for a legal career. After a meeting with Beethoven around 1815–16, he decided to devote himself to music and became a private music teacher in Bratislava. From 1821 he worked as a stage composer and conductor at the municipal theatres in Dresden (from 1821), Leipzig (from 1827), and the Court Theatre at Hanover (from 1830), where the opera Hans Heiling (1833) established his name among the leading German opera composers of the time. He died in Hanover.

Legacy
Marschner was widely regarded as one of the most important composers in Europe from about 1830 until the end of the 19th century. He was a rival of Weber and friend of Beethoven and Mendelssohn. His operas often contain thematic material based on folksong, and this folk-influenced genre had begun with Weber's Der Freischütz (1821). The last of his operas, Austin, was first staged in 1852. It was not very well received, and later the increasingly renowned Wagner overshadowed him.

Robert Schumann praised Marschner's piano trios lavishly. Marschner did not just toss off these works as an afterthought, but clearly devoted considerable time and effort to writing them. He gave the title "Grand Trio" to each of his works for piano, violin and cello, indicative of the importance he attached to them. In these pieces, one finds all of the emotions prevalent in the Romantic movement during the mid-19th century.

To the extent that Marschner is still remembered, it is largely for his operas Hans Heiling (1833), Der Vampyr (1828) and Der Templer und die Jüdin (1829), extremely popular in his lifetime. Marschner's ability to depict supernatural horror by musical means is especially evident in the first two operas as well as in some of his ballads, such as  "" (c. 1839).

Next to his operas, Marschner's most significant musical contribution is to the Lied. The best of his works in this form are comparable with those by Carl Loewe. He also wrote a considerable amount of chamber music, including seven piano trios, as well as unaccompanied male choruses that were very popular in the nineteenth century. While Marschner's operas strongly influenced Wagner, his chamber music, songs, and his cantata  (1842) were admired by Schumann, whose cantata Paradise and the Peri (1843) shows the older composer's influence. Marschner's Bagatelles for guitar (1814) have been taken up lately by some guitarists, and some of his chamber music is still very occasionally played. Among his operas, Hans Heiling and especially Der Vampyr have been adapted and revived in recent years with considerable success.

Selected works

Opera

Incidental music (Music to plays)
Prinz Friedrich von Homburg, Op. 56 (1821) to the play by Kleist
Schön Ella, Op. 27 (1822–3) to a play by Johann Friedrich Kind
Der Goldschmied von Ulm (1856) to a play by Salomon Hermann Mosenthal
Die Hermannsschlacht to the play by Kleist

Chamber music
Piano trio No. 1 in A minor, Op. 29
Piano trio No. 2 in G minor, Op. 111
Piano trio No. 3 in F minor, Op. 121
Piano trio No. 4 in D major, Op. 135
Piano trio No. 5 in D minor, Op. 138
Piano trio No. 6 in C minor, Op. 148
Piano trio No. 7 in F major, Op. 167
Piano quartet No. 1 in B-flat major, Op. 36
Piano quartet No. 2 in G major, Op. 158

Solo music
Douze Bagatelles pour la Guitarre, Op. 4

References

Some of the information on this page appears on the website of Edition Silvertrust but permission has been granted to copy, distribute and/or modify this document under the terms of the GNU Free Documentation License.
Heinrich Marschner Biography; list of operas and singspiels.

 
 Palmer, Allen Dean: Heinrich August Marschner, 1795–1861. His life and stage works. Ann Arbor 1980
 Weber, Brigitta: Heinrich Marschner. Königlicher Hofkapellmeister in Hannover. Hannover: Niedersächsische Staatstheater 1995. (Prinzenstraße. 5) 
 Von der Lucretia zum Vampyr. Neue Quellen zu Marschner. Dokumente zur Entstehung und Rezeption der Lucretia. Vollständige Edition des Reise-Tagebuchs von 1826 bis 1828. Anmerkungen zu Marschners journalistischem Wirken. Hrsg. und kommentiert von Till Gerrit Waidelich. Tutzing: Schneider 1996. 
 Heinrich August Marschner. Bericht über das Zittauer Marschner-Symposium. Ein Symposium des Instituts für Kulturelle Infrastruktur Sachsen. Hrsg. von Allmuth Behrendt und Matthias Theodor Vogt. Leipzig: Leipziger Universitätsverlag 1998. (Kulturelle Infrastruktur. Bd. 5) 
 Reclams Opernführer. Reclam-Verlag 1994,

External links

JMucci.com | Biography
Edition Silvertrust, Heinrich Marschner

1795 births
1861 deaths
19th-century classical composers
19th-century German composers
19th-century German male musicians
Composers for the classical guitar
German male classical composers
German opera composers
German Romantic composers
Honorary Members of the Royal Philharmonic Society
Male opera composers
Musicians from Hanover